Antonio Yanakis (6 July 1922 – 21 November 1997) was a Liberal party member of the House of Commons of Canada. He was born in Montreal, Quebec and became an industrialist by career after receiving a Bachelor of Commerce at McGill University in Montreal.

He represented the Quebec riding of Berthier—Maskinongé—delanaudière, later Berthier then Berthier—Maskinongé, since winning a seat in the 1965 federal election. Yanakis was re-elected in 1968, 1972, 1974, 1979 and 1980.

Yanakis was defeated in the 1984 federal election by Robert de Cotret of the Progressive Conservative party. He made another unsuccessful bid to unseat de Cotret in the 1988 election as an independent candidate.

External links
 
  Parliamentary tribute to Yanakis.

1922 births
1997 deaths
Liberal Party of Canada MPs
McGill University Faculty of Management alumni
Members of the House of Commons of Canada from Quebec
Politicians from Montreal